Prakasamnagar is situated in East Godavari district in Rajahmundry region, in Andhra Pradesh.

References

Villages in East Godavari district